Cora palustris is a species of basidiolichen in the family Hygrophoraceae. Found in Costa Rica, it was formally described as a new species in 2016 by Manuela Dal Forno, José Luis Chaves, and Robert Lücking. The specific epithet palustris is derived from the Latin palus ("bog" or "swamp"), and refers to its habitat at the type locality. The lichen occurs in the Cerro de la Muerte area of Costa Rica, where it grows on the soil with grasses and bryophytes.

References

palustris
Lichen species
Lichens described in 2016
Lichens of Central America
Taxa named by Robert Lücking
Basidiolichens